The first Czech presidential election was held in 1993, and elections have been held every five years since. The President was elected indirectly by parliament until the 2013 election and has been elected directly by Czech voters since then.

References